Campatonema yanayacua is a moth of the family Geometridae first described by Sullivan in 2010. It is known only from the type locality, the Yanayacu Biological Station in Ecuador.

Etymology
It is named after Yanayacu Biological Station, Napo, Ecuador.

External links
New species of the Neotropical genus Campatonema Jones (Geometridae, Ennominae) with the first description of the female

Ourapterygini
Moths described in 2010